David Halton (born Beaconsfield, Buckinghamshire,  England, 1940) is a Canadian reporter.  Until his retirement in June 2005, he was the senior correspondent in Washington for CBC News.

Biography
Halton was born in Beaconsfield, England in 1940.  His father Matthew Halton, was a war correspondent for the CBC Radio during World War II and died when David was 16 years old on December 3, 1956. The senior Halton had a big influence in David's career choice. His sister Kathleen Tynan was the second wife and biographer of the English theatre critic Ken Tynan.

David Halton joined CBC in 1965, and has spent time as a foreign affairs correspondent in:

 Paris correspondent 1965-1968
 Moscow correspondent 1968-1969
 London
 Quebec
 Middle East
 Vietnam 1970s
 Ottawa 1978-1991
 Washington, D.C. 1991-2005

Before moving to Washington, Halton was the chief political correspondent in Ottawa for the CBC.  He retired in June 2005, although he still acts as a special contributor on CBC, and is currently working on a book.

Halton is fluent in French and Russian.  He married his Russian wife, Zoya, while on assignment in Moscow.

His son Daniel used to work as a reporter for the CBC.

External links
 Halton's CBC biography
 A reporter's odyssey: CBC Profile on Halton's retirement
 CBC Digital Archives - Reports from Abroad: Matthew Halton

English emigrants to Canada
Canadian Anglicans
Canadian television reporters and correspondents
CBC Television people
People from Beaconsfield
Trinity College (Canada) alumni
University of Toronto alumni
1940 births
Living people
Canadian Screen Award winning journalists